Dorothy Chan is an American poet, author, editor, and scholar based in Eau Claire, Wisconsin. Chan's work has appeared in Poetry (magazine), The American Poetry Review, Academy of American Poets, and elsewhere. 
Chan has published four works of poetry: Revenge of the Asian Woman (Diode Editions, 2019), Attack of the Fifty-Foot Centerfold (Spork Press, 2018), BABE (Diode Editions, 2021), and the chapbook Chinatown Sonnets (New Delta Review, 2017). In 2018, Chan became Hobart Poetry Editor and later joined the English department faculty at the University of Wisconsin–Eau Claire in 2019 as Assistant Professor of Creative Writing. She is the co-founder and editor-in-chief of Honey Literary, a BIPOC-focused journal built by women of color.

Works
Revenge of the Asian Woman. Diode Editions. 2019. 
Attack of the Fifty-Foot Centerfold. Spork Press. 2018. 
Chinatown Sonnets. New Delta Review. 2017.
BABE. Diode Editions. 2019.

Awards and honors
2020 and 2014 Finalist for the Ruth Lilly and Dorothy Sargeant Rosenberg Poetry Fellowship from Poetry Foundation
2019 Finalist for the Lambda Literary Award in Bisexual Poetry
2019 Philip Freund Prize in Creative Writing from Cornell University

References

External links
 Official Website

Living people
American writers of Chinese descent
American LGBT poets
LGBT people from Wisconsin
Queer writers
American LGBT people of Asian descent
LGBT academics
University of Wisconsin–Eau Claire faculty
Year of birth missing (living people)
21st-century American poets
21st-century American women writers
American women poets
21st-century American LGBT people